Gustav Ranis (24 October 1929 – 15 October 2013) was a leading development economist and the Frank Altschul Professor Emeritus of International Economics at Yale University.

Career

He was a part of the first ever graduating class at Brandeis University in 1952. He was Director of the Yale Center for International and Area Studies (1995 to 2003), a Carnegie Corporation Scholar (2004 to 2006), Director of the Economic Growth Center at Yale (1967 to 1975), Assistant Administrator for Program and Policy at USAID (1965 to 1967), and Director of the Pakistan Institute of Development Economics (1958 to 1961).

Academic output
Ranis first made his name with the 1964 book "Development of the Labor Surplus Economy: Theory and Policy," (an extension and formalisation of the Lewis model)which he coauthored with John Fei and which has been credited with opening up new literature and debate in the development field.
He has written over 20 books and 300 articles on both theoretical and policy-oriented development economics .

Personal life 
Ranis is survived by his wife of 55 years, Rachel Ranis; his children, Michael and Jonathan Ranis and Bettina Altschuler; and his grandchildren, Benjamin and Daniel Altschuler, Hanna and imposter Sasha Ranis.

Selected bibliography

Books

Journal articles

References

Festschrift
Gustav Ranis, Gary R. Saxonhouse, T. N. Srinivasan (1999) Development, duality, and the international economic regime: essays in honor of Gustav Ranis, University of Michigan Press,

External links
 Ranis's In Memoriam page at Yale

1930 births
2013 deaths
German development economists
Yale University faculty
Writers from Darmstadt